Euchromius gnathosellus is a species of moth in the family Crambidae. It is found from west to central Africa, including Senegal, Sierra Leone, Ivory Coast, Ghana, Togo, Nigeria and the Central African Republic. The habitat consists mainly of plantation areas mixed with pockets of secondary forest.

The length of the forewings is 14–20 mm. The groundcolour of the forewings is creamy white, densely suffused with ochreous to dark brown scales. The hindwings are grey-brown with a darkly bordered termen and a dark spot near the cubital veins. Adults are on wing from October to the beginning of December with a peak in the last two weeks of November.

References

Moths described in 1988
Crambinae
Insects of West Africa
Moths of Africa